Wladislaus II of Poland may refer to:
Władysław II the Exile (1105–1159), High Duke of Poland
Jogaila (1351?-1434), King of Poland. Also known as Władysław II Jagiełło

See also 
 Ladislaus Jagiello (disambiguation)
 Ladislaus II (disambiguation)
 Ladislaus (disambiguation)